The Helicopter Association International (HAI) is a not-for-profit professional trade association of over  member organizations in more than 68 nations.

Since 1948, HAI has provided its membership with services that directly benefit their operations and advances the civil helicopter industry by providing programs that enhance safety, encourage professionalism and promote the unique contributions made by helicopters to society, according to its mission statement. Their Salute to Excellence awards are issued annually "for outstanding achievements in the international helicopter community".

Every year the HAI arranges the helicopter exhibition Heli-Expo. In 2013  visitors could explore the booths of 730 exhibitors.

References

External links 
 www.rotor.com — Helicopter Association International
 Whirly-Girls, International Women Helicopter Pilots, a member organization of HAI

Aviation organizations based in the United States
Organizations established in 1948
Helicopter organizations
Organizations based in Alexandria, Virginia
1948 establishments in the United States